Luz María Jerez is a Mexican actress in movies, television, and theater. She was born in San Miguel de Allende in the state Guanajuato on July 5, 1958.

Biography 
Luz María Jerez was born July 5, 1958. She started her career as an actress in theater in 1980, in a piece by Australian Morris West called El hereje, or The Heretic. The following year she debuted on television in the telenovela of Irene Sabido, called Nosotras las mujeres, or We the Women, and in 1983 debuted in the movie El día que murió Pedro Infante. Since then she has developed a solid career as a notable actress in movies, television, and theater. She has been in plays like Juegos de alcoba, No tengo no pago, El jardín de las delicias, La Celestina, Desencuentros, La casa de Bernarda Alba, Cinco mujeres and Las arpías, among many others. She has acted in movies like Silencio asesino, Noche de carnaval, Relajo matrimonial, Hasta que la muerte nos separe, La segunda noche and Castidad. Jerez has also been in telenovelas: Tú o nadie, El engaño, Yo compro esa mujer, Al filo de la muerte, Triángulo, Dos mujeres, un camino, Tres mujeres, Laberintos de pasión, Así son ellas, Al diablo con los guapos and Querida enemiga. She has also participated in television series like Mujeres asesinas and Hermanos y detectives.

In 2011 Jerez participated in the telenovela produced by Mapat L. de Zatarain called Ni contigo ni sin ti, or Neither With nor Without You, as Irene, a mother who neglects her family.

She worked on the telenovela Un refugio para el amor, or A Refuge for Love, a production by Ignacio Sada Madero in which she played Conny Fuentes Gil, the sister of the villain that was played by Laura Flores.

In 2013 she joined the cast of the telenovela Quiero amarte, or I Want to Love You, produced by Carlos Moreno Laguillo, and she embodied the character of Eloisa Ugarte, little sister of Lucrecia Ugarte de Montesinos, the character of main actress Diana Bracho.

In 2014 Jerez worked under the orders of producer Giselle González Salgado in her solo debut in the telenovela Yo no creo en los hombres, or I Don't Believe in the Men, where she shared credit with Azela Robinson, Rosa María Bianchi, Flavio Medina, Alejandro Camacho and Estefanía Villareal, among others.

List of works

Telenovelas (Spanish soap operas) 
 Quererlo todo (2020-2021) Minerva Larraguibel
 Cita a ciegas (2019) – Lorena
 Sin miedo a la verdad (2019) – Terapeuta
 Por amar sin ley (2018) – Pilar Huerta
 Mi marido tiene familia (2017) – Belén Gómez Beltrán
 La candidata (2016–2017) – Noemí Ríos de Bárcenas
 Tres veces Ana (2016) – Julieta de Escárcega
 Lo imperdonable (2015) – Lucía Hidalgo
 Yo no creo en los hombres (2014–2015) – Alma Mondragón de Bustamante
 Quiero amarte (2013–2014) – Eloísa Ugarte
 Un refugio para el amor (2012) – Constanza "Conny" Fuentes Gil Vda. de San Emeterio
 Ni contigo ni sin ti (2011) -Irene Olmedo de Rivas
 Sueña Conmigo (2010–2011) – Elena Molina
 Verano de amor (2009) – Aura de Roca
 Querida enemiga (2008) – Bárbara Amezcua de Armendariz
 Al diablo con los guapos (2007–2008) – Milena de Senderos
 Código Postal (2006–2007) – Irene Alonso de Rojas
 Clap... el lugar de tus sueños (2003–2004) – Victoria
 Así son ellas (2002–2003) – Rosa Corso de Calderón
 Por un beso (2000–2001) – Fernanda Lavalle de Díaz de León
 Cuento de Navidad (1999–2000) – Brisia
 Tres mujeres (1999–2000) – Renata Gamboa
 Laberintos de pasión (1999–2000) – Marissa Cervantes
 Desencuentro (1997–1998) – Sandra Lombardo
 La antorcha encendida (1996) – Doña Catalina de Irigoyen
 El premio mayor (1995–1996) – Cristina Molina
 El vuelo del águila (1994–1995) – Doña Inés
 Dos mujeres, un camino (1993–1994) – Alejandra Montegarza
 Triángulo (1992) – Mariana Armendariz
 Al filo de la muerte (1991–1992) – Iris Salgado
 Yo compro esa mujer (1990) – Úrsula
 Tal como somos (1987–1988) – Beatriz
 Lista negra (1986) – Violeta
 El engaño (1986) – Aminta Alvírez de Gunther / Mindy Gunther
 Tú o nadie (1985) – Martha Samaniego
 Nosotras las mujeres (1981) – Lucila

Television shows 

 Como dice el dicho (2013) – Natalia
  (2013) – Ingrid
 Durmiendo con mi jefe (2013) – Edith de Urrutia
 La rosa de Guadalupe (2008–2010) – Úrsula / Teresa
 Hermanos y detectives (2009) – Doctora
 Mujeres asesinas (2008) – Clara Fernández
 Bajo el mismo techo (2005) – Carmen
 Hora marcada (1986)

Movies 

 Acapulco, la vida va (2014) – Carmen
 Todas mias (2012) – Paulina
 Castidad (2010)
 La curva del olvido (2004)
 La segunda noche (1999)
 Secuestro salvaje (1994)
 Imperio de los malditos (1992)
 Sólo con Tu Pareja (1991) – Paola
 La venganza de los punks (1991)
 La tentación (1991) – Genoveva
 Secuestro equivocado (1991)
 Cóndor blanco (1991)
 Ritmo, traición y muerte (1991)
 Orgía de terror (1990)
 Machos (1990)
 Hasta que la muerte nos separe (1989) – Griselda
 Operación asesinato (1989)
 Flaco flaco, pero no para tu taco (1989)
 Entrada de la noche (1989)
 Un paso al más acá (1988) – María
 Relajo matrimonial (1988)
 Adorables criminales (1987)
 Los ojos del muerto (1987)
 Astucia (1986)
 El último disparo (1985)
 Noche de carnaval (1984) – Tulia Rivera
 Buenas, y con ... movidas (1983)
 Aborto: canta a la vida (1983)
 Preparatoria (1983)
 Silencio asesino (1983) – Martita
 Los cuates de la Rosenda (1982)
 Muerte en el Río Grande (1982) – Amiga de Pat
 El día que murió Pedro Infante (1982)

Theater 

 Un amante a la medida (2009)
 Las arpías (2009)
 Monólogos de la vagina (2008)
 Electra (2006)
 Hombres (2005)
 Trampa de muerte (2004)
 Cinco mujeres (2003)
 La casa de Bernarda Alba (2002)
 Desencuentros (2000)
 El viaje superficial (1997)
 Juegos de sociedad (1994)
 El jardín de las delicias (1985)
 Mi amiga la gorda (1985)
 La loba (1984)
 Sálvese quien pueda (1984)
 No tengo no pago (1984)
 La Celestina (1982–1987)
 Juegos de alcoba (1981)
 El hereje (1981)

Awards and nominations

References

External links 

 

1958 births
Living people
Mexican television actresses
Mexican telenovela actresses
Mexican stage actresses
Mexican film actresses
20th-century Mexican actresses
21st-century Mexican actresses
People from San Miguel de Allende
Actresses from Guanajuato